Chaetopterygini is a tribe of northern caddisflies in the family Limnephilidae. There are about 11 genera and at least 60 described species in Chaetopterygini.

Genera
These 11 genera belong to the tribe Chaetopterygini:
 Annitella Klapalek, 1907
 Badukiella Mey, 1979
 Chaetopterna Martynov, 1913
 Chaetopteroides Kumanski, 1987
 Chaetopterygopsis Stein, 1874
 Chaetopteryx Stephens, 1829
 Kelgena Mey, 1979
 Pseudopsilopteryx Schmid, 1952
 Psilopteryx Stein, 1874
 Rizeiella Sipahiler, 1986
 Vareshiana Marinkovic-Gospodnetic, 1967

References

Further reading

 
 
 

Integripalpia